Fahad Abdisamed Ishmail (born 2 September 1996) is a Somali footballer who last played as a midfielder for Jonava.

Club career
Born in Golweyn, Somalia, Ishmail joined English club Sheffield United as a youth player in 2013. Following his release in 2015, Ishmail played for Boston United, as well as spending time in Norway, playing on trial for Ullern IF. In 2017, Ishmail joined Lithuanian club FK Minija, making five appearances for the club, before signing for Jonava in January 2018, making 11 A Lyga appearances.

International career
On 5 September 2019, Ishmail made his debut for Somalia in a 1–0 win against Zimbabwe, marking Somalia's first ever FIFA World Cup qualification victory.

References

1996 births
Living people
Association football midfielders
Somalian footballers
People from Lower Shebelle
Somalia international footballers
Boston United F.C. players
A Lyga players
FK Minija Kretinga players
FK Jonava players
Somalian expatriate footballers
Somalian expatriate sportspeople in England
Expatriate footballers in England
Somalian expatriate sportspeople in Lithuania
Expatriate footballers in Lithuania